Daddy's Roommate is a children's book written by Michael Willhoite and published by Alyson Books in 1990. One of the first children's books to address the subject of homosexuality, the story follows a young boy whose divorced father now lives with his life partner. The book's depiction of a gay household has led to its inclusion in many educational programs, and Willhoite's work was awarded a Lambda Literary Award in 1991.

Due to the book's intended audience and the controversial topic of gay relationships, there have been numerous attempts to remove it from schools and libraries. Because of these attempts, it was the second-most challenged book in the United States from 1990 to 1999.

Summary 
The main character, who narrates the story, is a young boy whose parents were divorced the previous year. Living separately with both his mother and his father, the boy discovers that his father has a new roommate named Frank. He observes that his father and Frank do many activities together, including working, eating, sleeping, and occasionally even fighting. Additionally, the boy accompanies his father and Frank on multiple excursions, including trips to the zoo, beach, and a baseball game. The boy enjoys when Frank plays with him, cooks for him, and reads to him. When he asks his mother about his dad and his roommate, his mother explains that they are gay. When the boy is confused, his mother elaborates that the boy's dad and Frank partake in many of the same activities that other couples do, and that being gay is just another form of love. The story concludes with the boy's acknowledgement that since all of his parents are happy, he is happy too.

Genre 
This is a short picture book recommended for children between 2–8 years old. The illustrations are full-page watercolor paintings, with single-line text below. The book has been credited as having simple language and descriptive artwork that makes it easily accessible for young readers.

Reception

Awards

Under the Gay Men's Small Press category, Willhoites won a Lambda Literary Analysis award in 1991 following the book's release. Additionally, the book was honored by the Cooperative Children's Book Center's CCBC Choices list of best books in 2009 for its foundational role in gay literature.

Reviews

During the early 1990s, Daddy's Roommate was added to many public libraries following positive reviews in Publishers Weekly and Booklist. Publishers Weekly praised the book for raising public awareness for the lack of children's literature acknowledging homosexual relationships. Furthermore, both reviews commended the book for its charming and familiar illustrations that enable children to feel comfortable and ask questions about the book. Additionally, the book also received positive reviews from the School Library Journal and the Bulletin of the Center for Children's Books for its addressing and handling of living with two fathers. However, both evaluations noted that the quality of the writing itself was subpar, and that the story lacked depth or intrigue. A critique in Entertainment Weekly by Michele Landsberg echoed a similar sentiment, arguing that the sensitive topics of divorce and re-coupling were treated with relative indifference. Assessing that the book was so "blithe that it could almost be called Dick and Dick," Landsberg compared the book to the Dick and Jane stories that were often critiqued for their depictions of an idealized and stereotypical society.

In his piece "Defending Children's Schooltime Reading: Daddy's Roommate and Heather's Mommies", Patrick Finnessy asserts that Daddy's Roommate belongs in educational environments because it promotes dialogue about topics children might be confused by. Acknowledging that gay and lesbian people exist, Finnessy attests, is not necessarily deeming homosexuality proper so much as it is addressing a reality that children will experience. The book depicts a boy whose three parents all care for and love him, and Finnessy contributes multiple interviews from diverse parents who appreciate the book's loving, safe, and fun household that all children can learn from.

Controversy

In the decade following the book's publication, it was one of the most challenged books in the country, with the American Library Association listing it as the most contested book in 1993 and 1994. Its prominence as one of the first children's books to illustrate a gay relationships has led to its inclusion in various political and social debates since its publication.

In 1992, the school chancellor of the New York City public school system proposed the Multicultural Children of the Rainbow Curriculum. Two of the suggested reading materials were Daddy's Roommate and Heather Has Two Mommies. When it was publicized that New York City's public schools would be teaching about homosexual relationships, debates broke out on Nightline, Larry King Live, and in The New York Times, demonstrating why it was the most challenged book in America the next two years.

Lon Mabon, an Oregon politician, used Daddy's Roommate and Heather Has Two Mommies in his campaign to amend the state constitution to allow for discrimination against lesbians and gay men. He used the two books as evidence of a militant homosexual agenda that threatened childhood development. However, citizens of Oregon voted to defeat the measure on November 3, 1992.

Daddy's Roommate became a point of discussion during the 2008 US Presidential Election when it was alleged that Vice-Presidential candidate Sarah Palin had attempted to remove the book from a public library in Wasilla, Alaska. In 1995, then-councilwoman Palin requested that the local library remove the book three separate times. After the librarian refused, Palin fired her, before eventually rehiring her due to public backlash. Fellow councilwoman Laura Chase asked Palin if she had read Daddy's Roommate, and Palin responded that she "didn't need to read that stuff." The McCain-Palin campaign denied Palin's involvement in the case despite witness accounts claiming otherwise.

Other notable attempts to censor the book are listed below:

About the author 
Prior to writing Daddy's Roommate, Michael Willhoite was a cartoonist for the Washington Blade, a gay newspaper. His cartoons have been published in two different collections by Alyson Books.

In the tenth anniversary edition of Daddy's Roommate, an afterword is included by Willhoite reflecting on the book's tumultuous early history. Acknowledging that the book was the target of numerous acts of censorship, including burning, theft, and defacement, Willhoite thanks librarians across the country who "fought like tigers on the book's behalf." Demonstrating pride that the book was "still, triumphantly, what [he] first intended: a mirror in which children of gay parents can see themselves", Willhoite acknowledged that the book has been widely utilized to educate children about gay families.

Willhoite also wrote a sequel, Daddy's Wedding, which was published in 1996. The book features the same characters, and in this installment the boy serves as best man for their commitment ceremony.

See also
 Homosexuality in children's literature
 King & King by Stern Nijland and Linda De Haan depicts the marriage of two male princes.
 Jenny Lives with Eric and Martin by Susanne Bösche features a child that lives with two fathers.
 And Tango Makes Three by Justin Richardson illustrates the story of two male penguins who fell in love at the Central Park Zoo.

References

1991 children's books
1990s LGBT literature
Children's books with LGBT themes
American picture books
Lambda Literary Award-winning works
Obscenity controversies in literature
LGBT-related controversies in literature
Alyson Books books
Censored books